Penicillium phoeniceum is an anamorph, saprotrophic species of the genus of Penicillium which produces oosporein, phoenicine and phenicin.

References

Further reading 
 
 

phoeniceum
Fungi described in 1933